In algebra, a primordial element is a particular kind of a vector in a vector space.

Definition 

Let  be a vector space over a field  and let  be an -indexed basis of vectors for  
By the definition of a basis, every vector  can be expressed uniquely as

for some -indexed family of scalars  where all but finitely many  are zero. 
Let

denote the set of all indices for which the expression of  has a nonzero coefficient. 
Given a subspace  of  a nonzero vector  is said to be  if it has both of the following two properties:
 is minimal among the sets  where  and
 for some index

References 

Algebra
 
Vectors (mathematics and physics)